Locke may refer to:

People
John Locke, English philosopher
Locke (given name)
Locke (surname), information about the surname and list of people

Places in the United States
Locke, California, a town in Sacramento County
Locke, Indiana
Locke, New York, a town in Cayuga County
Locke Island, in the Columbia River in Washington
Locke Township, Michigan, a township located in Ingham County
Mount Locke, the site of the McDonald Observatory in the Davis Mountains of West Texas

Art and entertainment
Locke (film), a 2013 British film
Locke the Superman, a 1980s manga series by Yuki Hijiri and its anime film adaptations

Fictional characters
Locke, a pseudonym of Peter Wiggin in the Ender's Game novels, by Orson Scott Card
Locke, a protagonist of the manga Locke the Superman
Locke Cole, a character from the Final Fantasy VI video game
John Locke (Lost), a character in the television series Lost
Locke, the father of Knuckles the Echidna
Locke Lamora, the protagonist of the novel The Lies of Locke Lamora
Jameson Locke, the protagonist of the video game Halo 5: Guardians

Other uses
Locke High School, Los Angeles, California